Louis Adlon (7 October 1907 – 31 March 1947), also known as Duke Adlon, was a German-born film actor.

Biography
Adlon was the grandson of Lorenz Adlon, founder of the famous Adlon Hotel in Berlin, where he spent much of his childhood. Adlon was the son of Louis Adlon, Sr., who had five children with his first wife Tilly. After almost 15 years of marriage, he met a hotel guest, the German-American Hedwig Leythen (1889–1967), called Hedda, at a New Year's Eve party in the Hotel Adlon, left his wife and children, and in 1922 he married her. It was one of the biggest scandals of Berlin in the 1920s. Tilly moved with her daughter Elisabeth, then two, to the south of Germany, while the other children Susanne (mother of Percy Adlon), Lorenz and the twins Carl and Louis (junior) were sent to boarding school and later all four emigrated to America.

Adlon was a supporting actor and bit player in Hollywood from the late 1930s. He married  Rose Douras Davies, sister of actress Marion Davies. Adlon became a war correspondent for International News Service in May 1945, sent by his wife's sister's lover, William Randolph Hearst to a ruined Berlin, sees only a ruin of his parents' house, and a burnt Hotel Adlon. His first article is about personal loss, the destroyed city of his youth and the death of his father.

He died of a heart attack following a trip to Mexico. Originally interred in the Douras Family Mausoleum at Hollywood Forever Cemetery, he was removed and buried in front of the mausoleum in March 1951.

Although his Hollywood screen roles were minuscule at best, Adlon later gained fame as the main character of the 1997 semi-documentary In The Glamorous World of the Adlon Hotel, written and directed by his nephew, German cult director Percy Adlon.

See also
 Lorenz Adlon (1849–1921), German hotelier, grandfather of Louis
 Percy Adlon (born 1935, Munich), German film producer, cousin of Louis
 Pamela Adlon (born 1966), American actress, daughter-in-law of Percy
 Hotel Adlon, German film, from book by Louis's father's second wife

References

External links

1907 births
1947 deaths
20th-century German male actors
Louis
Burials at Hollywood Forever Cemetery
German expatriates in the United States
German male film actors